Kirby Mass Attack is a platform video game developed by HAL Laboratory and published by Nintendo for the Nintendo DS. Part of the Kirby series, it was released worldwide in late 2011, and is the fourth and last Kirby game to be released for the DS. The game was later released for the Wii U's Virtual Console in PAL regions in December 2015, in Japan on February 29, 2016, and in North America on July 28, 2016.

Gameplay
Kirby Mass Attack is a platform game with elements similar to that of the Lemmings series. Like Kirby: Canvas Curse, the player does not directly play the game with a directional pad, face buttons, or shoulder buttons. Instead, the player only uses the stylus and touch screen on the DS to play the game. The game is played by using the stylus to command up to ten Kirbys on the screen. Tapping the screen creates a star that the Kirbys can follow or cling onto. By tapping enemies or obstacles on the screen, players can send multiple Kirbys to attack them, with the player also able to flick individual Kirbys as projectiles. By collecting pieces of fruit throughout the level, the player can gain up to ten controllable Kirbys, which allow players to tackle enemies and obstacles more easily than with one Kirby. Each level often requires a minimum number of Kirbys to enter, and some puzzles will require all ten Kirbys to solve. If a Kirby is hit by an enemy or obstacle, it will turn blue until the end of the level, or until the player finds a special gate which restores their health. If a blue Kirby is hit, he will turn grey and float away unless the player can drag him down and turn him blue again, with the game ending if the player runs out of Kirbys or fails a certain level objective. Hidden throughout each game are several medals, found either by exploring, solving puzzles or finding keys and treasure chests, which in turn unlock additional minigames and bonus features. Some levels also feature large lollipops that temporarily make all the Kirbys bigger, allowing them to break through barriers and reach new areas.

Plot
Kirby travelled to the Popopo Islands, an archipelago in the south of Popstar, to explore. After Kirby fell asleep in a field, Necrodeus, the evil leader of the Skull Gang, appeared from the sky. Using his magic staff, Necrodeus struck Kirby and split him in ten tiny individual Kirbys, each with only a fraction of the original Kirby's power. After promptly defeating all but one of the ten Kirbys, the last Kirby notices a small star, which is his own heroic heart. After journeying through the Popopo Islands, he defeats Necrodeus in space and uses his staff's power to re-combine the 10 Kirbys into their original form.

Development and release
Under the direction of Mari Shirakawa and produced by Masanobu Yamamoto, Kirby Mass Attack was developed out of a desire from HAL Laboratories to integrate new, unique gameplay styles into the Kirby series; thus, focus was shifted away from Copy Abilities, which were typically a core aspect of Kirby games, and focused more on the idea of group management. While the team deeply considered including Copy Abilities as a mechanic, the development team decided to exclude it, after several talks with Nintendo and Senior Producer Kensuke Tanabe, in order to maintain focus on the game's new gameplay ideas, as well as avoid overcomplicating the use of multiple Kirby copies at once. Because of the nature of controlling several Kirby's at once, level design was kept simple in order to require less "athleticism" that is generally utilized in most platforming stages. High scores and collectible medals were used as features so that stages would be given more replayability and challenge, and also because the idea complimented the group management concept.

Despite being released well after the reveal of the Nintendo 3DS, Kirby Mass Attack was still developed on the DS rather than being released on the newer console. According to Shirikawa, this was partially because the game would not have taken extensive advantage of the system's stereoscopic 3D capabilities, meaning that making it for the 3DS would have been pointless.

Kirby Mass Attack was announced and shown at E3 2011. It was released in Japan on August 4, 2011, in North America on September 19, 2011, and in PAL regions in October 2011.

Media
A five volume manga of the series, titled  was written by Chisato Seki and illustrated by Yumi Tsukirino. It was published in Japan from 2016 by Asahi Production, serialized in the online social networking service based Facebook. In 2016, Atsumete! Kirby ended 2016. Three special volumes of the manga came out in Japan called "Kirby MASTER" (カービィマスター, Kābī Masutā), which had all the pages for each manga in color and has brand-new stories.

Reception

Kirby Mass Attack received "generally favorable" reviews, according to Review aggregator Metacritic. Destructoid said, "Cleverly designed, overwhelmingly cute, and devoted to fun, Kirby Mass Attack is a game that should become part of your handheld library without question." 1UP.com said it was a "brilliant game". In Japan, Famitsu gave it a score of all four nines for a total of 36 out of 40.

References

External links

Official website (Japanese)
Official website (Korean)

2011 video games
HAL Laboratory games
Nintendo DS games
Kirby (series) platform games
Video games developed in Japan
Video games scored by Shogo Sakai
Virtual Console games
Virtual Console games for Wii U
Video games produced by Kensuke Tanabe
Video games set on fictional islands
Single-player video games